Krabat – The Sorcerer's Apprentice is a 1978 Czechoslovak cutout animated dark fantasy film directed by Karel Zeman, based on the 1971 book Krabat by Otfried Preußler, and the Sorbian folk tale upon which the book is based. The name Krabat is derived from the word Croat.

Plot

Krabat, a beggar boy in early 18th century Lusatia, is lured to become an apprentice to an evil, one-eyed sorcerer. Together with a number of other boys, he works at the sorcerer's mill under slave-like conditions while learning black magic, such as guising himself as a raven and other animals. Every Christmas one of the boys has to face the master in a magical duel of life and death, where the boy never stands a chance because the master is the only person who is allowed to use his secret grimoire: The Koraktor, or the Force of Hell.

One Easter while performing an annual ritual near a small village, Krabat meets a girl and falls in love, but has to keep the romance secret in order to protect her. After witnessing his friends one after one being helplessly slaughtered by the master every Christmas, Krabat starts to sneak up at night to study the forbidden book. On the last page of the book, Krabat finds a phrase saying: "Love is stronger than any spell." This is used when he ultimately has to defeat his master for the sake of love.

Voice cast

See also
 Krabat (2008 film)

References

External links
 

1978 films
Czechoslovak animated films
Czech animated films
Films based on fairy tales
Animated films based on Slavic mythology
Films based on fantasy novels
Films based on German novels
Films directed by Karel Zeman
Films set in Europe
1970s stop-motion animated films
Animated films based on novels
Dark fantasy films
1978 drama films
Cutout animation films
Czech horror films
Czech fantasy films
Films with screenplays by Karel Zeman
1970s Czech-language films
Czech dark fantasy films
Czech animated fantasy films
Czech animated horror films